Taddei is an Italian surname. Notable people with the surname include:

Alessandro De Taddei (born 1971), Italian speed skater
Claudio Taddei (1966–2019), Uruguayan-Swiss singer-songwriter and painter
Frédéric Taddeï (born 1961), French journalist and television and radio host
Giuseppe Taddei (1916–2010), Italian baritone
Marco Taddei Né (born 1983), Ivorian football midfielder 
Mario Taddei (born 1972), Italian historian of science
Max Taddei (born 1991), Italian professional footballer
Nazareno Taddei (1920–2006), Italian Jesuit priest, linguist, author and film critic, after whom the Nazareno Taddei Award of the Venice International Film Festival is named
Paolino Taddei (1860–1925), Italian politician
Patrizia Taddei (born 1948), Sammarinese artist
Phillip Taddei (born 1975), American professor
Pier Paolo Taddei (born 1949), Sammarinese sports shooter
Riccardo Taddei (born 1980), Italian association footballer
Rodrigo Taddei (born 1980), Brazilian footballer
Rosa Taddei (1799–1869), Italian actress and poet
Rossana Taddei (born 1969), Uruguayan singer and composer
Taddeo Taddei (1470–1528), Florentine humanist and patron, after whom the Taddei Tondo is named
Valdir Antônio Taddei (died 2004), Brazilian zoologist and expert on Neotropical bats

See also
Taddei Tondo, a relief sculpture by Michelangelo

Italian-language surnames